Stefanos Galanopoulos (born 22 February 1993) is a water polo player of Greece. He was part of the Greek team winning the bronze medal at the 2015 World Aquatics Championships.

He was a member of the team that competed for Greece at the 2016 Summer Olympics. They finished in 6th place.

He plays for Greek powerhouse Olympiacos, with whom he won the 2017–18 LEN Champions League in Genoa.

See also
 Greece men's Olympic water polo team records and statistics
 List of men's Olympic water polo tournament goalkeepers
 List of World Aquatics Championships medalists in water polo

References

External links
 

1993 births
Living people
Place of birth missing (living people)
Greek male water polo players
Water polo goalkeepers
Olympiacos Water Polo Club players
Olympic water polo players of Greece
Water polo players at the 2016 Summer Olympics
World Aquatics Championships medalists in water polo